Peter Myers may refer to:

 Peter C. Myers (1931–2012), American politician in Missouri
 Peter Myers (basketball) (fl. 1984–1985), Australian basketball player
 Pete Myers (born 1963), American basketball player
 Pete Myers (radio broadcaster) (1939—1998) one of the founding DJs on BBC Radio One. Also BBC World Service and Radio Netherlands Worldwide.
 Pete "Mad Daddy" Myers (fl. 1950s–1960s), American radio disk jockey with WKNR
 Peter Myers, a character in the TV series Bitten

See also
 Peter Myers Pork Packing Plant and Willard Coleman Building, a packing house in Janesville, Wisconsin, built in 1851